New England Bible College is a small four-year coeducational Bible college in South Portland, Maine. There are on average 50 to 60 enrolled students each semester.

History

The Glen Cove Bible School was founded in 1959 as an affiliate of Glen Cove Christian Academy and Christian Schools, Inc. It was located in Glen Cove, Rockland, Maine. The Glen Cove Bible College closed in 1979 due to the insolvency of Christian Schools Inc. but reopened as the New England Bible College in 1980 in Portland. A year later, it moved to larger facilities at the First Baptist Church of South Portland. Rev. Richard Francis became the college's president in 2007.

References

External links
 New England Bible College official website

Bible colleges
Educational institutions established in 1959
Education in Portland, Maine
Education in South Portland, Maine
Education in Rockland, Maine
Universities and colleges in Cumberland County, Maine
Universities and colleges in Knox County, Maine
Seminaries and theological colleges in Maine
1959 establishments in Maine